Viral license is an alternative name for copyleft licenses, especially the GPL, that allows derivative works only when permissions are preserved in modified versions of the work. Copyleft licenses include several common open-source and free content licenses, such as the GNU General Public License (GPL) and the Creative Commons Attribution-Sharealike license (CC BY-SA).

Scope
The term is most often used to describe the GPL, which requires that any derivative work also be licensed under compatible licenses with the GPL. The viral component is described as such because the licenses spreads a continuing use of the licenses in its derivatives. The "virality" can force a license change of free software, e.g. when software is derived from two or more sources having incompatible viral licenses in which the derivative work could not be re-licensed at all.

Although the concept is generally associated with licenses that promote free content, some have attempted to compare it to the proprietary original equipment manufacturer source code software distribution agreements which grant licensees the right to redistribute copies of the software, but restrict what terms can be in the end user license agreement. Such licenses could be considered viral if they led derivative or connected software to gain the same license.

As an example of viral licensing outside software, after it was revealed that French author Michel Houellebecq plagiarized sections of Wikipedia articles in his novel La Carte et Le Territoire, some commentators said that this automatically made his entire book licensed under the CC BY-SA Attribution and ShareAlike license.

History
The term 'General Public Virus' or 'GNU Public Virus' (GPV) as a pejorative name dates back to a year after the GPLv1 was released. In 2001 Microsoft vice-president Craig Mundie remarked "This viral aspect of the GPL poses a threat to the intellectual property of any organization making use of it." In another context, Steve Ballmer declared that code released under GPL is useless to the commercial sector (since it can only be used if the resulting surrounding code becomes GPL), describing it thus as "a cancer that attaches itself in an intellectual property sense to everything it touches". In response to Microsoft's attacks on the GPL, several prominent Free Software developers and advocates released a joint statement supporting the license.

Criticism of the term
According to Free Software Foundation compliance engineer David Turner, the term viral license creates a misunderstanding and a fear of using copylefted free software. David McGowan has written that there is no reason to believe the GPL could force proprietary software to become free software, but could "try to enjoin the firm from distributing commercially a program that combined with the GPL'd code to form a derivative work, and to recover damages for infringement."  If the firm "actually copied code from a GPL'd program, such a suit would be a perfectly ordinary assertion of copyright, which most private firms would defend if the shoe were on the other foot."
Richard Stallman has described this view with an analogy, saying, "The GPL's domain does not spread by proximity or contact, only by deliberate inclusion of GPL-covered code in your program. It spreads like a spider plant, not like a virus."

Interoperability
Popular copyleft licenses, such as the GPL, have a clause allowing components to interact with non-copyleft components as long as the communication is abstract, such as executing a command-line tool with a set of switches or interacting with a Web server. As a consequence, even if one module of an otherwise non-copyleft product is placed under the GPL, it may still be legal for other components to communicate with it normally. This allowed communication may or may not include reusing libraries or routines via dynamic linking — some commentators say it does, the FSF asserts it does not and explicitly adds an exception allowing it in the license for the GNU Classpath re-implementation of the Java library.

The interoperability clauses are often pragmatically inoperative due to the vigorous enforcement and strict interpretation of the GPL as it related to integration, aggregation, and linking. It is argued that most forms of incorporation, aggregation, or connectivity with GPL-licensed code is a derivative work that must be licensed under the GPL. In recent years, a number of communities using GPL-incompatible licenses have dropped efforts and support for interoperability with GPL-licensed products in response to this trend. Some developers and communities have switched to the GPL or a GPL-compatible license in response, which critics and supporters alike agree is intentional result.

See also
 Viral phenomenon
 Permissive license
 Patentleft

References

External links
 MS lawyers join open source fray, CNET, Stephen Shankland, 25 June 2001

Criticism of copyleft